Aristotelia heliacella is a moth of the family Gelechiidae. It is found in France, Switzerland, Austria, Germany, Italy, Finland, Norway and Sweden.

The wingspan is 10–11 mm. Adults have been recorded on wing from June to August.

The larvae feed on Dryas octopetala.

References

Moths described in 1854
Aristotelia (moth)
Moths of Europe